Shantou Experimental School (汕头市 实验 学校 Shàn-tóu-shì shí-yàn xué-xiào) is a public school, located in Longhu District, within the city proper of Shantou, Guangdong, China.

Established in 1999 and operated by the Education Bureau of Shantou City, the school currently caters for approximately 3000 students from Years 1 to 9.

References

External links 
 Official website in Chinese

Shantou
Schools in Guangdong